New River Public Library Cooperative is a three county public library cooperative in north central Florida.  The libraries in Baker, Bradford and Union Counties are members.

Established in 1996, New River Public Library Cooperative supports and enhances public library services in the three county area. New River Public Library Cooperative is governed by two County Commissioners from each member county.

The Cooperative provides bookmobile service  to the three counties, outreach to local child care centers, and telecommunications and automation support to the member libraries.

References

External links 
New River webpage and online catalog
 New River blog: A Library Minute

County library systems in Florida
Libraries in Florida